Akodon budini, also known as Budin's akodont or Budin's grass mouse, is a species of rodent in the family Cricetidae. It is found in the Andes of northwestern Argentina and adjacent Bolivia. The species is named after Emilio Budin, an Argentine specimen collector who worked with Oldfield Thomas.

References

Literature cited
Jayat, J. and Pardinas, U. 2008. . In IUCN. IUCN Red List of Threatened Species. Version 2009.2. <www.iucnredlist.org>. Downloaded on April 2, 2010.
Musser, G.G. and Carleton, M.D. 2005. Superfamily Muroidea. Pp. 894–1531 in Wilson, D.E. and Reeder, D.M. (eds.). Mammal Species of the World: a taxonomic and geographic reference. 3rd ed. Baltimore: The Johns Hopkins University Press, 2 vols., 2142 pp. 

Akodon
Mammals of Argentina
Mammals described in 1918
Taxa named by Oldfield Thomas
Taxonomy articles created by Polbot